The 2001 Big 12 Conference baseball tournament was held at AT&T Bricktown Ballpark in Oklahoma City, OK from May 17 through 21.  Nebraska won their third tournament in a row and earned the Big 12 Conference's automatic bid to the 2001 NCAA Division I baseball tournament. The tournament mirrored the format of the College World Series, with two 4-team double-elimination brackets and a final championship game.

It was also the final appearance for Iowa State in the tournament, as they discontinued their baseball program following the season.

Regular Season Standings
Source:

Colorado did not sponsor a baseball team.

Tournament

Kansas, Kansas State, and Missouri did not make the tournament.

All-Tournament team

See also
College World Series
NCAA Division I Baseball Championship
Big 12 Conference baseball tournament

References

Big 12 Tourney media guide 
Boydsworld 2001 Standings

Tournament
Big 12 Conference Baseball Tournament
Big 12 Conference baseball tournament
Big 12 Conference baseball tournament
Baseball competitions in Oklahoma City
College sports tournaments in Oklahoma